The Rossi Model 971 is a revolver manufactured by the Rossi Firearm Company of Brazil, which was owned by the Interarms Firearms of Alexandria, Virginia.

Description
The 971 is offered in calibers .38 Special +P  and .357 Magnum only. The revolver is double-action and it fires six rounds per load. It weighs one pound and fourteen ounces. It is nine and one-eighth inches long (depending on barrel length) and it is five and seven-sixteenths up and down. It is made of steel and its finish is blued. The 971 was also manufactured in a stainless steel model. The 971's sights are adjustable and its sight radius is five fifteen-sixteenths inches.

Variants
Along with the 971 Rossi also produces the Model 972. This is a polished stainless steel version of the 971 with a 6-inch barrel length. Both revolvers have a rubberized finger grove grip and adjustable rear sight (both windage and elevation). The 971 and 972 are both produced in Brazil by Taurus Firearms Ltd. under license from Rossi USA.

Both the model 971 and 972 are certified for use with .38 Special +P rounds, and had a limited lifetime warranty through Rossi USA.

References 

Rossi Firearms
Revolvers of Brazil